Jatun Rumi (Quechua jatun big, rumi stone, "big stone") is a mountain in the Andes of Bolivia which reaches a height of approximately .

References 

Mountains of Potosí Department